A woo woo (also called teeny weeny woo woo) is an alcoholic beverage made of vodka, peach schnapps, and cranberry juice. It is typically served as a cocktail in a highball glass or can be served as a shot. It can also be served in a rocks glass. The ingredients are usually shaken together with ice or stirred as preferred. A lime wedge is used as a garnish.

The drink became popular in the 1980s along with other cocktails containing peach schnapps such as the Fuzzy Navel and Silk Panties. Writing on the then-recent rise of peach schnapps in Esquire for March 1988, food and drink writer William Grimes commented:

The woo woo is a relative of the Cape Codder (vodka and cranberry juice) and both have shared highball relatives in the Sea Breeze, the Bay Breeze, the Madras, and Sex on the Beach. The baby woo woo is a shooter variation containing equal parts vodka, peach schnapps, and cranberry juice.

See also
 Sex on the Beach
 List of cocktails

References

External links 
Woo Woo Recipe - Retrieved 10 October 2009.
Making multiple shots

Cocktails with vodka
Cocktails with fruit liqueur
Three-ingredient cocktails
Cocktails with cranberry juice
Cocktails with light rum